Jahan Khvosh (also Romanized as Jahān Khvosh, Jahan Khosh, and Jahān Khowsh) is a village in Borborud-e Gharbi Rural District, in the Central District of Aligudarz County, Lorestan Province, Iran. At the 2006 census, its population was 419, in 84 families.

References 

Towns and villages in Aligudarz County